Ruxandra Dumitrescu (born April 20, 1977) is a retired volleyball player born in Galați, Romania. She competed with the Romania women's national volleyball team at the 1994 FIVB Volleyball Women's World Championship in Brazil. She is a naturalized Greek citizen, and competed with the Greece women's national volleyball team from Athens 2004 Olympic Games until 2009. She is 186 cm tall.

Dumitrescu played on club level with Dacia Pitesti 1994-1997. In her career with Vrilissia Athens Team (1997-2003), she won one championship, three Greek cups, and a bronze medal in European Cup and with Panathinaikos women's volleyball team (2003–10), winning six championships, five cups, and reached the 2009 final of the CEV Women's Challenge Cup. Her shirt number (9) was retired by the club in her honour. She was voted Most Valuable Player of the Greek championship in 2009 and Most Valuable Player of the Greek Cup Final Four twice, in 2008 and 2009.

She is a devoted fan of Panathinaikos A.O. and in 2012 she was a candidate with the Panathinaikos Movement. She was married to Alexandros Nikolaidis and they have a son named Filippos.

References

Sources
 Rouxi Doumitreskou
 contra.gr

1977 births
Panathinaikos Women's Volleyball players
Greek people of Romanian descent
Greek women's volleyball players
Romanian women's volleyball players
Romanian expatriates in Greece
Living people
Sportspeople from Galați